Saigon, U.S.A. is a 2004 documentary film about Vietnamese Americans that live in the United States. It was produced and directed by Lindsey Jang and Robert C. Winn
and has a duration of 57 minutes.

References

External links
Saigon, U.S.A.

Vietnamese-American history
Vietnamese documentary films 
Documentary films about Asian Americans